Rifflandia Music Festival is a four-day multi-venue music festival held at the Royal Athletic Park in Victoria, British Columbia. With no fixed date, the festival has occurred in the month-long span between the last weekend of August and the last weekend of September. Rifflandia was first launched on August 29, 2008.  In 2019 it was canceled due to "economic instability in the festival market," with the hope of returning in 2020 which did not happen either due to coronavirus.

Rifflandia also includes Artlandia, the War Child Lounge, and publishes an annual magazine. Local brewery and sponsor Phillips Brewery also produces a Rifflandia beer, Rifflandabrau, sold around the festival's time. The festival is staged by a local production company, Atomique Productions, and is sponsored by local businesses and various members of the media.

History

2016

Line-up

Thursday, September 15 
Night Stages:

 Illvis Freshly
 The Good Guys
 The Beatnuts
 De La Soul
 Andrew Judah
 Goodwood Atoms
 Little India
 The Tourist Company
 DJ Wood
 Vespers
 Shylow
 Moontricks
 DJ Jetts
 DJ Surgery
 DJ All Good
 Bryx
 Lovecoast
 Joy District
 Baskery
 The Windowlickers
 Spaceport Union
 Wishkicker
 No Liars
 Dante Hadden
 Maverick Cinema
 Familiar Wild
 Terence Jack
 Yuk Yuk's Comedy Winners

Friday, September 16 
Night Stages:

 Sweetleaf
 Pigeon Hole
 Bomba Estéreo
 Keys N Krates
 En Noir
 Miami Nights 1984
 Hodge
 Goldfish
 Jeremy Loveday
 DJ KWE
 Shane Koyczan
 Hello Moth
 Groenland
 We Are The City
 Michael Bernard Fitzgerald
 Vince Vaccaro
 I M U R
 Windmills
 Youngblood
 Hot Panda
 Rafferty Funksmith
 Burning Rainbow
 The Gaff
 Dunks
 Akela + Tedder
 Kirtay
 Bullet Bill
 Kid Kurse
 Grizzly Timbers
 San Felix
 Dralms
 Peach Pit
 The Villanovas
 The Prettys
 Malahat
 Mesa Luna
 Bocce Avocado
 Mu
 Caveboy
 Stetson Road
 Fintan O'Brien
 Genevieve and the Wild Sundays
 Relaxation Sounds + Lil Halo
 Neon Annex
 Hermit
 Noscar
 Kyross
 Zoo Riots
 Mouth Breather
 Kermode
 Astrocolor
 Ivan Decker

Main Stage:
 The Choir
 Bomba Estéreo
 X Ambassadors
 Michael Franti & Spearhead
Rifftop Tent:
 Grossbuster
 The Elwins
 Lee Scratch Perry

Saturday, September 17 
Night Stages:

 A DJ Called Malice
 Lucas Dipasquale
 John River
 Classified
 Vortoozo
 Levi Hawk + Jay Somethin'
 Dirty Radio
 Prozzäk
 Pif Paf
 Groenland
 Caveboy
 Operators
 DJ KWE
 Daniele Mereu
 Rennie Foster
 Aux 88
 Derrival
 Kaylee Johnston
 Fake Shark
 JPNSGRLS
 DJ Low
 Applecat
 Juice
 DJ Shub
 DJ Arktic
 Primitive
 Ganjoid
 Ghostwhip
 Big Little Lions
 Morning Show
 The Katherines
 Royal Wood
 Railtown Sound System
 Wooden Horsemen
 Dope Soda
 Entagados
 Phonosonics
 Frankie
 Khari Wendell McClelland
 Sohpia Danai
 Tami Neilson
 Madness Blooms
 Big Little Lions
 Eshe Nkiru
 Fvde
 bbno$
 Immerze
 Czech Royalty
 The Carlines
 Lovers Touch
 Zoubi and the Sea
 The Wild Romantics
 Leland Klassen
Main Stage:
 The Choir
 No Sinner
 The Zolas
 Coleman Hell
 Band of Skulls
 Jurassic 5
Rifftop Tent:
 Fox Glove
 Moontricks
 Band of Rascals
 Tennyson
 The Beatnuts

Sunday, September 18 
Main Stage:
 The Choir
 Chance Lovett & the Broken Hearted
 Fruit Bats
 Jesse Roper
 Wolf Parade
Rifftop Tent:
 Fallbrigade
 Astrocolor
 Darcys
 Shane Koyczan & the Short Story Long
 Del the Funky Homosapien

2015

Line-up

Thursday, September 17 

Night Stages:

Jazz Cartier
Post Malone
Flatbush Zombies
Walshy Fire
Torro Torro
Jillionaire
Guests
Max Renn
Philthkids
Sinistarr
Cascadia Sound
Daniele Mereu
Rennie Foster
Righteous Rainbows of Togetherness
Wild Ones
Frog Eyes
Coleman Hell
Spaceboots
Tower of Dudes
Rugged Uncle
Seven Year Old Poets
Labs
Stray Cougar
Highs
Storyhive Winner Alberta
Big Goose
Blackwood Kings
Bodies
Ben Rogers
Drew Farrance & Morgan Cranny
Darcy Collins
James Ball

Friday, September 18 

Night Stages:

Pigeon Hole
The Underachievers
Doomtree
DJ Shrew
AppleCat
Onra
A Tribe Called Red
Jay Malinowski + the Deadcoast
Chad VanGaalen
Hayden
MF Jones
Marshall A
DJ Murge
The Stockers
Class of 1984 
The Vicious Cycles
Punk Rock Karaoke
Big Body
Sean Evans and Bokeh
The Librarian
Xxxy
Bugatti Boys
Bogman
Mr. Moe
Miami Nights 1984
Secret Sun
Emilie and Ogden
Seoul
Plants and Animals
Sticky Fingers 
Slim Sandy
Market East
Little Hurricane
Random Citizen
Illvis Freshly
LIINKS
Storyhive Winner BC
Fans and Motor Supply Co
Chersea
The Archers
Steve McMath and Shane Priestly
Evan Mumford and Myles Anderson

Main Stage:

The Choir
The Dears
Arkells

Rifftop Tent:

Blonde Redhead
A Tribe Called Red

Saturday, September 19 

Busty and the Bass
Five Alarm Funk
J Feud
Lori the HiFi Princess
Mat the Alien
Longwalkshortdock
Ria Mae
Leisure Cruise
Moon King
The Zolas
Marshall A
Jansom
Wood N Soo
Marshall A
Justin Brave + Ishkan
Hip Hop Karaoke
Emplicit
Hi-Q Soundsystem
Self-Evident
Mumdance
Phrase
DJ Low
J.F.Killah
The Helio Sequence
Aegis Fang
Gang Signs
Vogue Dots
Man Made Lake
Chris Ho
Brothers
Justine Drummond and Wes Borg
Chelsea Lou Uphoff and Shawn Ohara

Main Stage:

Young Empires
Brave Shores
Plants and Animals
Big Data
Tokyo Police Club
Modest Mouse

Rifftop Tent:

The Choir
Dirty Radio
Sticky Fingers
The Zolas
Neon Indian
Kiesza

Sunday, September 20 

Main Stage:

Vic High R&B Band
The Walkervilles
Jesse Roper 
Hollerado
Joey Bada$$
Mother Mother

Rifftop Tent:

The Choir
Grounders
Tacocat
Emancipator
Julian Casablancas + The Voidz

2014

Line-up

Thursday, September 11 

Night Stages:

The Numero Group
Ratking
Danny Brown
Sinesthetix
Dead Air
Vaski
Zeds Dead
Oliver Swain's Big Machine
Choir Choir Choir
The Choir
Adam Cohen
Davenport
The Wild Romantics
The Shilohs
Paper Lions
Little Wild
Smash Boom Pow
Mark Mills
Dralms
Chet
Wintermitts
Little India
Derrival
Willhorse
Letr B
Avalon Emerson
Max Ulis
Tessela
Electric Oak
Twin Bandit
Luca Fogale
Fox Glove
Noah Edwards
Pax
Battery Poacher
Grossbuster
BnW (Blondtron & Waspy)
Darcy Collins
Rob Pue

Friday, September 12  

Night Stages:

The Beatnuts
Kool Keith
Del The Funky Homosapien
G.I. Blunt
Sabota
Hrdvsion
Tiger and Woods
Kalle Mattson
Old Man Canyon
Rising Appalachia
Jon and Roy
Shaprece
Ivan & Alysosha
Horse Feathers
Born Ruffians
Pickwick
MF Jones
Miami Nights 1984
Humans (DJ Set)
DJ Stallion
Speed Control
Ellice Blackout
We Hunt Buffalo
JPNSGRLS
Kate Kurdyak
Thieves
Good For Grapes
Rococode
Zerbin
Fall Fair Car
Lola Parks
Paperboys and the Messengers
Devon Coyote
The Roper Show
Shawn Mrazek Lives!
Cool
Cowards
Needs
Single Mothers
Skye Wallace
Jasper Sloan Yip
Damn Fools
Mindil Beach
Transient
Hashman Deejay
Rennie Foster
Graze
Jackie Trash
Punkerslut
eXam
Acab Rocky
Sydney York
Riiivr
Emplicit
Hi-Q Soundsystem
Taal Mala
Shawn O’Hara
Mike Delamont

Main Stage:
Reuben and the Dark
We Are Scientists
Airbourne
Serena Ryder

Rifftop Tent:
The Glorious Sons
Born Ruffians
Dragonette

Saturday, September 13 

Night Stages:

Sims (of Doomtree)
Zion I
Hilltop Hoods
DJ Applecat
Poirier
Addison Groove
Paper Diamond
DJ Tim Horner
The Valuables
The Ballantynes
The Skatalites
Windmills
Mozart’s Sister
Kandle and the Krooks
The Franklin Electric
Half Moon Run
DJ Trever
DJ Wood
Neon Steve
DJ Stallion
Astral Swans
Raleigh
MANcub
Napalmpom
Chersea
Isobel Trigger
Sam Weber
Coyote
Rich Aucoin
222
Ruby Karinto
Annie Becker
The New Groovement
Bocce Avocado
Dead Soft
Minto
Wimps
Maniac
PS I Love You
Jody Glenham
Hunting
Liinks
Humans (DJ Set)
Laggards
Monolithium 
Michael Red
Visionist 
Cocahala
Close The Bombay Doors
Bodies
Rosie June
David Vertesi
Jacques Porveau
DJ Primitive 
En Noir and Natron
Wax Romeo
Myles Anderson
Ivan Decker

Main Stage:

Choir Choir Choir
The Choir
Head of the Herd
Le Butcherettes
The Airborne Toxic Event
The New Pornographers
Death Cab For Cutie

Rifftop Tent:

Kytami
Bum
Latyrx
Dum Dum Girls
Rusko

Sunday, September 14 

Main Stage:
Zeus 
Dear Rouge
SonReal
To Be Announced
Girl Talk

Rifftop Tent:

Vic High R&B Band
Lowell
Lightning Dust
Keys N Krates
Half Moon Run

2013

Line-up

Friday, September 13 

Night Stages:

 Shrew
 Wood & Soo
 The Hood Internet
 The Funk Hunters
 Disco 3
 Pat Mahoney
 James Murphy
Grossbuster
Anomie Belle
Weird Party
Humans
Watsky
 Pigeon Hole
 Serengeti
 Jel
 Mykki Blanco
 Boots Of Mischief
 GodzBallz
 Rotterdam
Spaceboots
J-Feud
Monolithium
Hrdvsion
Ikonika
The Carlines
The Archers
The Belle Game
Dusted
Braids
Olav
 Hi-Q Soundsystem
 Dead Air
 Murge
 Alexandria Maillot
 HRDWTR
Fields of Green
Prairie Cat
Pompadoors
Cleopatra & The Nile
Juvenile Hall
Bloody Wilma
The Mants
Peace
Familiar Wild
Hannah Epperson
Carousels
Wand
Versa

Saturday, September 14 

Main Stage:

 No
 Mounties
 Classified
 Courtney Love

Side Stage:
 Easy Star All-Stars
 Z-Trip
 Current Swell

2012 

For its fifth year, Rifflandia built on the success of the Royal Athletic Park as a flagship venue, while also using night stage venues, including the return of the Market Square stage. Rifflandia V occurred on September 13–16. Headlining the festival was the Flaming Lips, Sloan, Cake, and Mother Mother.

Line-up

Thursday, September 13 

Night Stages:

 Hundy Thou
 Royal Canoe
 Kids and Explosions
 Doldrums
 Austra
 
 Lost Lander
 Bonehoof
 Wake Owl
 Rich Aucoin
 5AM
 Okibi
 Graintable
 Grenier
 Kode 9
 Christopher Arruda
 Northcote
 King Dude
 Frazey Ford
 Good for Grapes

Friday, September 14 

Main Stage:

 The Xylopholks
 Rich Aucoin
 Band of Skulls
 The Flaming Lips

Side Stage:
 Brasstronaut
 The Aggrolites
 Macklemore and Ryan Lewis

 Night Stages:

 AFK
 Zara Taylor
 Lazy Rich
 Morgan Page
 Rooftop Runners
 Leisure Suit
 Rykka
 Humans
 Trust
 Measureless
 Needs
 White Lung
 Indian Handcraft
 Fucked Up
 Wolfheart
 The Washboard Union
 The Chantrelles
 The Stanfields
 Transient
 En Noir
 Nina Mendoza
 Lunice
 The Wicks
 Christopher Smith
 Snowblink
 The White Buffalo
 Young Pacific
 Horse Feathers
 Hayley Sales

Saturday, September 15

Main Stage: 
 The Xylopholks
 Zerbin
 The Jezabels
 Dan Mangan
 Cake

Side Stage:  
 Family of the Year
 Bright Light Social Hour
 The Stanfields
 The Dudes
 Sloan

Night Stage:  

 OKPK
 Mat the Alien
 Cold Blank
 Longwalkshortdock
 The June Fiasco
 Jinja Safari
 Krief
 Nightbox
 Rennie Foster
 The Old Wives
 Vicious Cycles
 Bright Light Social Hour
 Chixdiggit
 Natron
 Monolithium
 Kevin McPhee and Ronnie Falcon
 L-Vis 1990
 Shayne Avec I Grec / Jeremy Loveday
 Kids and Explosions
 Jackson 2 Bears
 Saul Williams
 Carmanah

Sunday, September 16 

Main Stage:
 The Xylopholks
 Jinja Safari
 Current Swell
 The Head and the Heart
 Reggie Watts
 Mother Mother

Side Stage: 
 The Archers
 Grand Analog
 MC Yogi
 Hey Ocean!
 Everlast

2011 

In 2011, the fourth-annual Rifflandia restructured its venues and the festival-going experience by including the Royal Athletic Park as the flagship venue, with eight additional evening venues. The new location allowed for a main stage and side stage, as well as a partnership with local food and drink vendors, and the introduction of Rifflandia Cinema. Rifflandia IV occurred from September 22–25. The night venues included Alix Goolden Hall, Phillips Brewery, Club 9One9, the Victoria Events Centre, Lucky Bar, Metro Theatre, Wood Hall and Sugar Nightclub. The line up included City and Colour, Broken Social Scene, Cold War Kids and Mother Mother.

Line-up

Thursday, September 22 

Night Stages:  

 Members of Gvyo
 Nik-Tex
 Painted Palms
 Nosaj Thing
 St. Christopher
 The Big Reds
 P.O.S
 The Coup
 City of 9s
 Jim-E Stack
 Jokers of the Scene
 LA Riots
 Circadian Kingdom
 Wool on Wolves
 Man Made Lake
 Young Rival
 Spilly Gs
 Monolithium
 Tokimonsta
 Eskmo
 The Tower of Dudes
 Freedom or Death
 Pepper Rabbit
 Braids
 Seaweed Head
 Kim Churchill
 The Archers
 We Are The City

Friday, September 23 

Main Stage:
 Dinosaur Bones
 The Cave Singers
 Ra Ra Riot
 Mother Mother
 Broken Social Scene

Side Stage:
 Randy Ponzio
 Mike Edel
 Jon Middleton
 The Besnard Lakes
 Jakarta

Night Stages: 

 Provincial Archive
 Chains of Love
 Damien Jurado
 The Cave Singers
 DJ Anger
 Jeremy & Boitano
 Michael Rault
 KO
 DJ Speedy Shoes
 Wood and Soo
 Araabmuzik
 Sage Francis
 Redbird
 No Sinner
 Shuyler Jansen
 Library Voices
 Full Function
 Eames
 Poison Grade
 Eliot Lipp
 Rococode
 The Coppertone
 Malajube
 The Besnard Lakes
 Adam Barter
 Sheroams
 Lola Parks
 Mathew Barber

Saturday, September 24 

Main Stage:
 Vince Vaccaro
 Jets Ovehead
 Awolnation
 Cold War Kids
 City and Colour

Side Stage: 
 Sun Hawk
 Mindil Beach Markets
 Library Voices
 Hollerado
  Ubiquitous Synergy Seeker (USS)

Night Stages:

 Wildlife
 The Dirty Mags
 Giant Sang
 J Mascis
 The Funk Hunters
 Mia Moth
 Righteous Rainbows
 Bocce Avocado
 Trouble Andrew
 Glass Candy
 Beekeeper
 The Belle Game
 Young Liars
 Acres of Lions
 Shrew & Mr. Smith
 Outsider
 XI
 Machinedrum
 Olenka
 Suuns
 Bonjay
 The Pack A.D.
 Lindsay Bryan
 Hawk and Steel
 Old Man Luedecke
 Royal Wood

Sunday, September 25 

Main Stage:
 Kuba Oms and the Velvet Revolution
 Gomez
 Blackalicious
 Daniel Wesley
 De La Soul

Side Stage:
 The Scale Breakers
 Greenlaw
 Lance Herbstrong
 The Knocks
 Felix Cartal

2010 

The third Rifflandia Festival featured a record 165 artists over four days at 11 festival stages with approximately 3,500 attendees from September 23–26. Rifflandia III also introduced "Win!landia," a treasure hunt city-wide across Victoria, and Artlandia, an art showing in partnership with White Hot Magazine.

Line-up

Thursday, September 23 

 Liam Lux
 Maris Otter
 Maurer
 The Beat Assassins
 Rhythmicon
 Balacade
 Sunday Buckets
 Mike Edel
 Calico Mountain
 Dead Eyes Open
 Mr. Smith
 Class of 1984
 Kuba Oms
 Natron
 The Sentimentals
 Acres of Lions
 DJ Woof
 Seven Year Old Poets
 Sound and Science
 Skylo
 Brasstronaut
 DJ Rowan
 Lily Fawn’s Brightest Darkest Lullabies
 The Tabla Guy
 We Are The City
 Grand Analog
 Start with the Cobra
 Mykee
 Great Bloomers
 J-Feud
 Kenzie Clarke
 Mount Kimbie
 Styrofoam Ones
 Tyger Dhula
 Forestry
 Run Like Hell
 Felix Cartal
 Current Swell
The Hounds Below
 K'Naan
 Aesop Rock
 You Say Party
 Neighbour
 Lee Ranaldo
 Delhi 2 Dublin
 JFK (of MSTRKRFT)
 Dayglo Abortions

Friday, September 24 

 Liam Lux
 Quoia
 Super Bendy Thumbs
 Pigeon Hole
 Genevieve Rainey
 Fatso
 The Zolas
 Ryat
 My Lovely Son
 Rule 27
 Amortals
 Treelines
 Tommy Guerrero
 Sam Demoe
 Lesbian Fist Magnet
 Hot Sex & High Finance
 Clay George
 Maurice
 Monarch
 The Wicks
 Steph Macpherson
 Eames
 Mark Berube and the Patriotic Few
 Top Less Gay Love Tekno Party
 The Whitsundays
 Tunde Olaniran
 Yukon Blonde
 Megasoid
 TV Heart Attack
 Fine Mist
 Growler
 The Wooden Sky
 Longwalkshortdock
 The Keg Killers
 Jets Overhead
 Aidan Knight
 Run Chico Run
 Black Hat Villain
 Vincent Parker
 Gord Downie
 Great Lake Swimmers
 Goodbye Beatdown
 The Racoons
 Shout Out Out Out Out
 Men Without Hats
 D.O.A.
 Egyptrixx

Saturday, September 25 

 Liam Lux
 Justin Brave
 The Lytics
 Lola Parks
 Cityreal
 Liz Beattie
 Teen Daze
 Pawnshop Diamond
 Rich Aucoin
 No Don’t Stop
 Aquitania
 Bells and Cannons
 Myles Black and the Pearly Whites
 Chali 2na
 Kate Miller-Heidke
 Geoff Berner
 CFC
 Children of Celebrities
 Bloody Wilma
 Reid Jamieson
 DJ Weezl
 Diamond Rings
 Times Neue Roman
 Hayley Sales
 Okay City
 The Globes
  Ariel Pink’s Haunted Graffiti
 Louise Burns
 Longshanks
 Ghostkeeper
 Melissa Auf der Maur
 Hey Rosetta!
 Mindil Beach Markets
 Whale Tooth
 Michael Bernard Fitzgerald
 Hollerado
 Jon and Roy
 Tanlines
 Frog Eyes
 The Dodos
 Sarah Harmer
 The Gaslamp Killer
 Dojo Workhorse
 Ko
 Chad VanGaalen
 Kathryn Calder
 Hot Hot Heat

Sunday, September 26 

 Ballgag N’ Chain Gang
 DJ Anger
 Outsider
 Lando Rock
 Fight in the Fields
 Patience Automate
 BigMuff
 Humans
 Siclife
 The Mighty Apos
 The Big Reds
 Lazers
 Degree One
 Bucan Bucan
 Champion Sound Dee Jays
 Distance

2009 
Rifflandia II grew with 2,500 people in attendance, with over 80 artists and more venues. Rifflandia Magazine was first published for Rifflandia II. The festival was held from September 24–27. The venues included Sugar Nightclub, Element Nightclub, Alix Goolden Hall, Metro Theatre, Market Square, the University of Victoria’s Vertigo, Lucky Bar, and the Strathcona Rooftop.

Line-up

Thursday, September 24 
 
 The Blue Violets
 Analog Bell Service
 Christopher Smith
 Hannah Georgas
 Johnny and the Moon
 Rubik
 Timber Timbre
 KRLZ
 Dan Mangan
 Creature
 Phantogram
 Aquitania
 Sam Bradley
 Bucan Bucan
 The Racoons
 Said the Whale
 Final Fantasy
 Beach House
 Fake Shark - Real Zombie!
 Basia Bulat
 Longshanks & Kenzie
 Shad
 Fan Death
 Champion and His G-Strings
 My!Gay!Husband!
 Longwalkshortdock

Friday, September 25 

 Aidan Knight
 Vince Vaccaro
 Our Book and the Authors
 Ruby Blue
 Maurice
 An Horse
 Celebrity Traffic
 Brandi Disterheft
 Bahamas
 In-Flight Safety
 Cuff the Duke
 Acres of Lions
 Tegan and Sara
 Library Voices
 Woodpigeon
 Techromancer
 Slut Revolver
 Zeus
 Espionage
 The Dudes
 Twin Crystals
 k-os
 Mother Mother
 The Most Serene Republic
 Flash Lightnin’

Saturday, September 26 

 Sex With Strangers
 
 Caracol
 Laura Smith
 Siclife
 Adjective
 Penderecki Quartet
 Holy Fuck
 Ookpikk
 Hank and Lily
 CHAR2D2
 The Laundronauts
 Jordan Klassen
 Bogus Tokus
 Colourbook
 B. Traits
 Jon and Roy
 Jon-Rae Fletcher
 Neoteric
 The Pack A.D.
 Jets Overhead
 DJ Longshanks
 Hey Rosetta!
 Brendan Canning (DJ Set)
 k-os (DJ Set)
 Mexican Power Authority
 Buck 65
 Pink Mountaintops

Sunday, September 27 
 Mother Mother
 Brendan Canning(DJ Set)
 k-os (DJ Set)

2008
The inaugural Rifflandia started as a three-day festival from August 29–31, with seven stages, 65 artists and approximately 1,500 people in attendance. The venues were organized in a showcase style  and included Alix Goolden Hall, Element Nightclub, Logan’s Pub, Lucky Bar, McPherson Playhouse, Royal Theatre, Smith’s Pub, Sugar Nightclub and the Strathcona Rooftop.

Line-up

Friday, August 29 

 Dreamboat
 Cobras Cobras Cobras
 Man Man
 The Whigs
 VinCat
 Johnny and the Moon
 Lion Thief
 Never Never Band
 Black Mountain
 Bill Stuart
 The Paper Cranes
 Seven Year Old Poets
 Away R’io
 The Upsidedown
 The Green Hour Band
 Colourbook
 Meatdraw
 Listening Party
  You Say Party! We Say Die!
 The Walkmen
 Man Man

Saturday, August 30 

 Lord Beginner
 Kemal Evans
 Bloody Wilma
 Jon and Roy
 The Blakes
 The BE-IN (Mr. Sensitive, Luke Wolf and Shamelesson)
 Pride Tiger
 Current Swell
 Chet
 Growler
 Blitzen Trapper
 Howlin' Rain
 Tanya Tagaq
 Sam Demoe
 Handsome Furs
 Tim Horner
 Final Fantasy
 Ishkan
 Counting Heartbeats
 Verse
 Theset
 Just B
 Bison
 Brother Ali

Sunday, August 31 

 Jay Tay
 DJ Bellyfish
 Murge
 Wood and Soo
 Aidan Knight
 Degree One
 Laura Smith
 D Whiz
 DJ Z-Trip
 The Mess Around
 BNGZ N’ KRLZ
 Guy Woods
 1900s
 Sweatshop Union
 DJ Longshanks
 Tim Finn
 ½ Alive
 The Beatnuts
 Guns N’ Bombs

Artlandia 

Artlandia is the art component of Rifflandia. It was launched in 2010 with Rifflandia III in partnership with White Hot Magazine, featuring a variety of artists in different galleries near and during the time of the festival. For 2012, Artlandia included the Live!Stock poster show and Headspace.

War Child Lounge 

The War Child Lounge was first launched during Rifflandia III in 2010. It features intimate acoustic performances from artists performing that year. All donations from the sets go directly to War Child Canada. Past performers include Hey Rosetta!, USS, Mother Mother, Jets Overhead and Melissa Auf der Maur In 2012, War Child Lounge featured Luluc, Current Swell, Rich Aucoin, Family of the Year, Hey Ocean!, Mother Mother and Frazey Ford.

Rifflandia Magazine 

The first edition of Rifflandia Magazine was published for the 2009 festival. It is a free publication published annually since 2009 that features profiles on the artists playing, a festival schedule and map. It also includes details on other Rifflandia events, like Win!landia, Artlandia, War Child Lounge, and Wristband Connect. In 2012, the magazine also included a Rifflandia passport and fortuneteller.

External links

References

Music festivals in British Columbia
Festivals in Victoria, British Columbia
Music festivals established in 2008
2008 establishments in British Columbia